The Marlin-class submarines are a proposed class of diesel-electric attack submarines. The design features diesel propulsion and an additional air-independent propulsion (AIP), developed solely by the French company DCNS, formerly  DCN, after the Spanish company Navantia (formerly Bazan, then Izar), its partner in the  design, went with Lockheed Martin to build the competing , which was selected by the Spanish Navy to form its next-generation submarine force, at the expense of the Scorpène.

Not much is known about this design, however DCNS's successful Scorpène class is approximately 1,800 tons while the S-80 is 3,500 tons. Therefore it is likely that DCNS's Marlin-class design is larger than the Scorpène in order to compete on the international market with Navantia's bigger S-80 submarine, currently under construction for the Spanish Navy.

Submarine classes
Proposed ships